INRI studio is an independent production house from Singapore, founded by cult director Tzang Merwyn Tong in 1999. The studio has - to this date - produced two films, A Wicked Tale and e’Tzaintes, both of which premièred to critical acclaim in the international film festival circuit. The studio's mission is to create a platform for writers, storytellers, musicians and film-makers to come together to present alternative art forms to mainstream audiences. Their Mantra – To Provoke the Senses and Open the Mind.

History
INRI studio was a concept that came about in 1999 when Tzang Merwyn Tong and long time friend Armen Rizal Rahman, an aspiring musician, decide that it was time they band together to create a production company they can call their own. They roped in Lee Amizadai and together the unit identified themselves as INRI studio.

The trio went on to make their very first film together. Using their scrap earnings and savings that they have accumulated over the years, the team of film-makers started work on their first film e’Tzaintes. The film’s a teenage black comedy about a bunch of social outcasts. It was a project that took them 3 years to complete.

The film was a hit when it premièred at GV Grand at Great World City in Singapore in January 2003. Tickets to this independent première were completely sold out with people even paying to sit on the aisles.

e’Tzaintes went to travel to a couple of film festivals. It premièred in Europe in 2004 as the Opening Night Film of the Berlin Asia-Pacific Film Festival and was screened as part of the Asian New Force at the Hong Kong IFVA Festival.

The studio then embarked on their second film, A Wicked tale, starring Evelyn Maria Ng as the Little Red Riding Hood character in Tzang Merwyn Tong’s dark re-imagination of the Brothers Grimm fable. The film made its World Premiere to a full house crowd at the Rotterdam International Film Festival and was later invited to FanTasia Film Festival to be screened as one of the Closing Night films. The movie won the Gold Remi Award at WorldFest in Houston. In December 2005, INRI studio made history by being the first short film in Singapore to be released commercially on DVD.

The INRI studio collective now consists of artists, writers, musicians and filmmakers coming together to explore new ways of how they can take things to the next level. An underground music project is currently in the pipeline.

Etymology
The word INRI is inspired by the inscription on the cross from which Jesus Christ was crucified. INRI is a Latin acronym for Iesus Nazarenus Rex Iudaeorum (literally translated as Jesus of Nazareth King of Jews). The letters can be found inscribed on a stylized plaque (or parchment) hanging just above the corpse of Christ on many depictions of the Crucifixion.

Contrary to belief, the use of the name INRI is neither religious nor sacrilegious. Tzang Merwyn is known to be a big fan of mythology and he considers the crucifixion a romantic and inspiring historic parable.

It's a story about a man (assumed by many as a heretic) who refuses to deny accusations that he was the Saviour even though he was about to be nailed to the cross. The story is symbolical of the kind sacrifice one has to make to stage a revolution, and the letters, INRI, a reminder to Tzang and his team mates that mockery and ridicule awaits those who choose to do things differently.

Official filmography
 e’Tzaintes giving self-deceit a better name (2003)
A Wicked tale (2005)

References

External links 
 Official Website
 
 FanTasia write-up
 Lund Fantastisk Film festival write-up
 Interview with Tzang Merwyn Tong taken from The Montreal Mirror

Singaporean film studios